Marjorie A. Priceman (born 1958) is an American writer or illustrator of more than 30 children's picture books including two Caldecott Honor Books (runners-up for the Caldecott Medal). Her first picture book, Friend or Frog, was published in 1989, soon after her graduation from the Rhode Island School of Design. Priceman's books are known for their bright watercolors, free-flowing lines and whimsical spirit. One of her most popular books is Zin! Zin! Zin! A Violin, a recipient of the Honor. She resides in Lewisburg, Pennsylvania.

References

External links

 

1958 births
American children's book illustrators
American children's writers
Rhode Island School of Design alumni
Living people
Date of birth missing (living people)
Caldecott Honor winners